Who Killed Dr Bogle and Mrs Chandler? is an Australian documentary film about the mysterious deaths of Dr Gilbert Bogle and Mrs Margaret Chandler in Sydney, Australia in 1963. Although it was assumed the couple were murdered, police investigators could find or produce no evidence that it was actually murder. The documentary, directed and written by Australian documentary film maker Peter Butt, presents unique evidence to suggest the couple died from hydrogen sulphide poisoning emanating from a river.

Summary 
When the half-naked bodies of brilliant physicist, Dr Gilbert Bogle, and his lover, Mrs Margaret Chandler, were found in bizarre circumstances on a Sydney riverbank in 1963, it set into play an unprecedented forensic investigation.

Autopsies offered little clue as to how the couple died, only that there were signs of a rapidly acting poison. Despite assistance from the FBI and Scotland Yard, the poison was never identified. At the end of a long and controversial coronial inquest, no cause of death, killer or motive could be identified.

In the ensuing years, scores of tabloid theories have been put forward, from LSD to Cold War assassinations. But in the minds of many, including the police, Margaret Chandler's husband, Geoffrey, was the likely culprit.

Cast

Reception

Television 
The film premiered on the Australian Broadcasting Corporation on 7 September 2006. 1.8 million people in the five major capitals tuned in, plus an estimated 700,000 viewers in the other cities and regional areas, making it the most-watched Australian documentary ever screened on the network, as well as the most-watched program in 2006 on the ABC. It was the number one program in Sydney, Melbourne, Adelaide, Perth and Brisbane.

Awards and recognition 
Who Killed Dr Bogle and Mrs Chandler? was well received by television critics, scientists, and politicians and won Most Outstanding Documentary in the 2007 TV Week Logies.

References

External links 
Movie Trailer and Book
 Official Website
IMDb Entry

Australian independent films
Australian documentary television films
2006 television films
2006 films
Documentary films about water and the environment
Films scored by Guy Gross
2000s English-language films
Documentary films about death